Uyghur Doppa Cultural Festival, is an internationally celebrated Uyghur cultural festival which is observed on May 5 annually since 2009.

History
The festival was created by Tahir Imin, an independent researcher and social activist in 2009. That year in Urumqi, the celebration was broadcast by the central China broadcasting station in Beijing and publicized through Uyghur websites. In 2010, the festival was organized by the students of Beijing Normal University and supported by the Beijing Municipal religious and ethnic affairs administration bureau officials.

Other names
Uyghur Doppa Cultural Festival also called Doppa Cultural Festival, Doppa festival, Doppa Day, Uyghur Doppa Medeniyet Bayrimi, Doppa bayrimi, 维吾尔花帽文化节，花帽节，朵帕节 in Chinese or Uygur Doppa Kültür Festivali in Turkish, is a cultural festival for Uyghur people living in Xinjiang Uyghur Autonomous Region, China.

Observance and traditions
By 2011, Uyghur Doppa was celebrated all around China, especially in the southern and northern parts of Xinjiang. A meeting and seminar on the festival was organized by the Yakan (shache) county and Kashgar Prefecture local Government. The festival celebrates Uyghur culture and development.

Types and variations

See also
Doppa
Uyghurs

References

7-Uyghur Academy Popilar Website :
The Doppa In Uighur Hat culture 
http://www.akademiye.org/ug/?p=8491
8-

Festivals in China
Uyghur culture
Tourist attractions in Xinjiang